Packera obovata, commonly known as roundleaf ragwort, spoon-leaved ragwort, roundleaf groundsel, or squaw-weed, is an erect perennial herb in the Asteraceae (aster) family native to eastern North America. It was previously called Senecio obovatus. Basal and lower leaves are obovate with toothed margins, while upper leaves are pinnately divided. The ray flowers are yellow and the disk flowers orange-yellow, the inflorescences being held well above the foliage.

Description
The basal leaves are mid-green and hairless, circular, oval or obovate in shape and have crinkly toothed margins. The leaf stalks are about the same length as the leaf blades, green or purplish in colour and usually hairless; some have slight winging and may be cobwebby-pubescent. The flower stalk may also be cobwebby at the base, and bears two or three alternate pinnatifid leaves with irregular lobes. The flower-head has a single row of linear-lanceolate green bracts, eight to sixteen yellow ray-florets and a central mound of orange-yellow disk florets. Both ray and disk florets are followed by brown achenes set in tufts of white hair. The achenes are dispersed by the wind, and the plant can also spread by vegetative growth from stolons or rhizomes.

Distribution and habitat
The native range of P. obovata is northern Mexico, the eastern United States and south-eastern Canada, extending from Coahuila to Quebec and Ontario. It is most common in the southern half of the range. Typical habitats include moist but well-drained calcareous soils, wooded slopes, and rocky areas in shaded or semi-shaded locations.

Ecology
Flowers of P. obovata bloom in the early spring and are visited by cuckoo bees, halictid bees, andrenid bees, hoverflies, tachinid flies and various species of beetle. The larvae of the northern metalmark butterfly (Calephelis borealis) feed on the leaves of the plant, and the white-crossed seed bug (Neacoryphus bicrucis) feeds on the seeds. Like many species of ragwort, the plant is toxic to many herbivorous mammals, but sheep seem more tolerant of it than are most other grazing animals.

P. obovata forms colonies by spreading through rhizomes. Dense colonies can form in wet, sunny areas, while the colony will be sparser with shorter plants in drier, shadier spots.

References

External links
Plants Profile for Packera obovata (roundleaf ragwort)

obovata
Flora of Northeastern Mexico
Flora of the Northeastern United States
Flora of the South-Central United States
Flora of the Southeastern United States
Flora of Eastern Canada
Flora of the Appalachian Mountains
Flora of the Great Lakes region (North America)
Plants described in 1803
Taxa named by Gotthilf Heinrich Ernst Muhlenberg